Jahu may refer to:

Given name 
 Jahu Dewitt Miller (1857–1911), American educator, librarian, journalist, minister, orator and book collector
 Ja Hu Stafford (1834–1913), sometimes spelled Jahu, an American pioneer of Cochise County, Arizona
 Jahu Taponen, Finnish inline hockey goaltender - see 2013 IIHF Inline Hockey World Championship
 Jahú, footballer in Brazil - see 1930 São Paulo FC season
 Jahu, a fictional character in Sky Doll comics

Other uses 
 Jahu (Himachal Pradesh), a village in Himachal Pradesh, India
 Zungaro jahu, a species of Zungaro, long-whiskered catfishes 
 Jahú, a Savoia-Marchetti S.55 flying boat that crossed the Atlantic in 1927
 Jahu, a matchmaker in a Hajong marriage

See also 
 Jehu (disambiguation)